is a railway station in the city of Natori, Miyagi, Japan, operated by third-sector railway operator Sendai Airport Transit (SAT).

Lines

Station layout
The station consists of an elevated island platform serving two tracks, allowing trains to pass on the otherwise single line. Both tracks are bi-directional, with platform 2 used (mostly for Sendai-bound trains) only when trains cross here.

Adjacent stations

History
The station opened on 18 March 2007, coinciding with the opening of the Sendai Airport Line. The line was severely damaged by the 2011 Tōhoku earthquake and tsunami and service was suspended indefinitely from 11 March 2011, not reopening until 1 October, nearly 7 months later.

Passenger statistics
In fiscal 2018, the station was used by an average of 1,437 passengers daily (boarding passengers only).

Surrounding area
The station is located in a suburban area.

See also
 List of Railway Stations in Japan

References

External links

  

Railway stations in Miyagi Prefecture
Sendai Airport Line
Railway stations in Japan opened in 2007
Natori, Miyagi